The 1937–38 Serie A season was the 12th season of the Serie A, the top level of ice hockey in Italy. AC Milanese DG won the championship by defeating AC Milanese DG II in the final.

Final
AC Milanese DG - AC Milanese DG II 5:3

External links
 Season on hockeytime.net

1937–38 in Italian ice hockey
Serie A (ice hockey) seasons
Italy